Nicholas is a male given name and a surname.

The Eastern Orthodox Church, the Roman Catholic Church, and the Anglican Churches celebrate Saint Nicholas every year on December 6, which is the name day for "Nicholas". In Greece, the name and its derivatives are especially popular in maritime regions, as St. Nicholas is considered the protector saint of seafarers.

Origins 
The name is derived from the Greek name Νικόλαος (Nikolaos), understood to mean 'victory of the people', being a compound of νίκη nikē 'victory' and λαός laos 'people'. An ancient paretymology of the latter is that originates from λᾶς las (contracted form of λᾶας laas) meaning 'stone' or 'rock', as in Greek mythology, Deucalion and Pyrrha recreated the people after they had vanished in a catastrophic deluge, by throwing stones behind their shoulders while they kept marching on.
 
The name became popular through Saint Nicholas, Bishop of Myra in Lycia, the inspiration for Santa Claus, but it predates said Bishop by several centuries: the Athenian historian Thucydides for example, mentions that in the second year of the Peloponnesian War (431–404 BC) between Sparta and Athens, the Spartans sent a delegation to the Persian king to ask for his help to fight the Athenians; a certain Nikolaos was one of the delegates.

The customary English spelling Nicholas, using a ch, as though the word were spelled in Greek with a chi, first came into use in the 12th century and has been firmly established since the Reformation, although the spelling Nicolas is occasionally used.

Male variations
Variations for males include:

 

, Nikolac, Nikolaj





Female forms

Female forms include:

Bulgarian: Николина (Nikolina), Николета (Nikoleta), Никол (Nikol), Нина (Nina)
Czech: Nikol, Nikoleta, Nikola, Nicol
Dutch: Klasina, Klazina, Nicole, Nicolien, Nicolet, Nicoline
Danish: Nikoline
English: Nicole/Nichole, Nicola/Nichola, Nicolette, Colette
French: Colette, Coline, Nicole, Nicolette, Nicoline, Cosette
German: Nicole, Nikole, Nicola, Nikola
Greek: Νίκη (Níkē, a conflation with Níke), Νικολέτα (Nikoléta), Νικολίνα (Νikolína)
Hungarian: Nikolett
Italian: Nicoletta, Nicole, Nicolina
Macedonian: Nikolina
Norwegian: Nilsine, Nicoline
Polish: Nikola
Portuguese: Nicole
Romanian: Niculina, Nicoleta
Scottish: Nicola, Nicholas (Lowlands 18th/19th century)
Serbo-Croatian: Nikolija (archaic), Nikolina, Nikoleta
Slovak: Nikola, Nikoleta
Slovene: Nika
Spanish: Nicolasa, Nicoleta, Nicole

People known as Nicholas

Single name (rulers, popes, patriarch and antipopes)
Antipope Nicholas V
Nicholas I of Russia
Nicholas II of Russia
Nikola I Petrović-Njegoš (1840–1921) King of Montenegro
Patriarchs of Constantinople, of which the best known are Nicholas Mystikos and Nicholas III Grammatikos
Prince Nicholas of Romania (1903–1978)
Pope Nicholas I
Pope Nicholas II
Pope Nicholas III
Pope Nicholas IV
Pope Nicholas V

Given (first) name
Nicholas Yaw Boafo Adade (1927–2013), Ghanaian judge, Attorney General of Ghana from 1969 to 1971
Nicholas Alipui, UNICEF's director of programmes
Nicholas Allard (born 1952), American Dean and President of Brooklyn Law School
Nicholas Ansell (born 1994), Australian footballer
Nicholas Bacon (disambiguation), several people
Nicholas Bayard (1644–1707), American official
Nicholas Bayard (theologian) (fl. 1300?), Dominican theologian
Nicholas Bett (1992–2018), Kenyan hurdler
Nicholas Braun (born 1988), American actor
Nicholas Briggs (born 1961), British actor, voice of the Daleks on Doctor Who
Nicholas Caldwell (1944–2016), American R&B singer, original member of The Whispers
Nicholas "Nick" Cannon (born 1980), American actor, comedian, rapper, and radio/television personality
Nicholas Choi, Hong Kong fencer
Nicholas A. Christakis (born 1962), American sociologist and physician 
Nicholas "Nick" Chubb (born 1995), American football player
Nicholas Clapp, American writer, film-maker, and amateur archaeologist
Nicholas "Nick" Clegg (born 1967), British politician
Nicholas Courtney (1929–2011), British actor known for playing the Brigadier, Alistair Gordon Lethbridge-Stewart, in Doctor Who
Nicholas of Cusa (1401–1464), German philosopher, theologian, jurist, and astronomer
Nicholas Dias Abeysinghe (1719–1794), Sri Lankan Maha Mudaliyar
Nicholas "Nick" Drake (1948–1974), English singer-songwriter and musician
Nicholas "Nick" Ephgrave, British senior police officer
Nicholas Fattoush (born 1943), Lebanese politician
Nicholas Fernando (1932–2020), Roman Catholic Archbishop of Colombo from 1977 to 2002
Nicholas "Nick" Frost (born 1970), British comedian, actor and screenwriter
Nicholas "Nick" Fuentes (born 1998), American right-wing political commentator
Nicholas Hoult (born 1989), English actor and model
Nicholas Scott Lachey (born 1973), American singer, songwriter, actor, producer, and television personality
Nicholas Laughlin (born 1975), Trinidad and Tobago writer and editor
Nicholas Lash (1934–2020), British theologian
Nicholas Latifi (born 1995), Canadian racing driver
Nicholas Markowitz (1984–2000), American murder victim
Nicholas Massey (born 1989), American professional wrestler, one half of The Young Bucks
Nicholas Megura (1920–1988), American flying ace during World War II
Nicholas D. Miller (born 1990), American DJ known professionally as Illenium
Nicholas Mosley (1923–2017), British novelist and aristocrat
Nicholas Nahas (born 1946), Lebanese businessman and politician
Nicholas Negroponte (born 1943), Greek American computer scientist and architect
Nicholas Patrick (born 1964), British-American engineer and astronaut
Nicholas Paul (cyclist) (born 1998), Trinidadian track cyclist
Nicholas Pegg, British actor, director and writer
Nicholas Pertuit (born 1983), American football player
Nicholas Petit-Frere (born 1999), American football player
Nicholas "Nick" Jay Rickles (born 1990), American baseball player
Nick Robinson (disambiguation), several people, including Nicholas and Nicky
Nicholas Sparks (politician) (1794–1862), American politician
Nicholas Sparks (born 1965), American novelist, screenwriter
Nicholas Tatambuka (born 1985), Ugandan singer and dancer known as Nick Nola
Nicholas Tse (born 1980), Hong Kong singer and actor
Nicholas Winton (1909–2015), British humanitarian, nicknamed the British Schindler
Nicholas Wrigley (born 1955), British merchant banker

Nobility
 Nicholas I of Russia (1796–1855), Emperor of Russia
 Nicholas II of Russia (1868–1918), Emperor of Russia
 Prince Nicholas of Greece and Denmark, son of George I of Greece

Saints
Saint Nicholas The Duc Bui, one of the Vietnamese Martyrs
Saint Nicholas of Flüe
Saint Nicholas of Japan
Saint Nicholas of Myra, also known as Sinterklaas or Santa Claus
 Saint Nicholas of Tolentino
 Saint Nicholas of Russia (Nicholas II of Russia)

Surname 
Bob Nicholas (born 1957), American politician
Cindy Nicholas (1957-2016), Canadian long distance swimmer
Cyril Nicholas (1898–1961), Sri Lankan Burgher army captain, civil servant, and forester
Edward Nicholas (1593–1699), English politician 
Fred Nicholas (1893–1962), British cricketer
George Nicholas (politician) (1754–1799), American law professor, son of Robert C. Nicholas Sr.
George Nicholas (footballer) (born 1992)
Harry Nicholas (1905–1997), British trade unionist
John Nicholas (academic), 17th-century Oxford administrator
John Nicholas (congressman) (1764–1819), American lawyer and politician, father of Robert C. Nicholas
John Nicholas (judge), Australian judge
John Nicholas (of Chepstow), 17th-century English politician
John Spangler Nicholas (1895–1963), American embryologist
Nick St. Nicholas (born 1943), musician
Paul Nicholas (born 1944), English actor and singer
Phil Nicholas (born 1955), American politician
Philip Nicholas (1876–1952), Welsh rugby player
Robert C. Nicholas (New York politician) (1801–1851), American politician
Robert Carter Nicholas, Sr. (1728–1780), American lawyer and politician
Robert Carter Nicholas (1793–1857), American planter and politician
Samuel Nicholas (1744–1790), the first American Marine officer and commandant
Sandra Lovelace Nicholas (born 1948), Canadian indigenous activist and senator
Thomas Nicholas (disambiguation), several people
Victor A. Nicholas (1897–1956), second Sri Lankan to hold post of Postmaster General of Sri Lanka
William H. Nicholas (1892–1984), American politician
William Nicholas (officer) (1785–1812), British Army officer
Wilson Cary Nicholas (1761–1820), American banker and politician
 The Nicholas Brothers, American tap dancers:
 Fayard Nicholas (1914–2006)
 Harold Nicholas (1921–2000)

See also

Nick (short form) 
Nicky, Nickey, Nicki, Nickie, Niky, Nikky (nicknames)
Nicholaus
Nicolas (disambiguation)

References

Given names of Greek language origin
English-language masculine given names
English masculine given names
English-language surnames
Given names
Surnames